Suneil Anand (born 30 June 1956) is an Indian actor and director. He is the son of actors Dev Anand and Kalpana Kartik. He runs Navketan Films.

Early life
He was born in 1956 in Zurich, Switzerland, while his parents were on their way to attend the Karlovy Vary Film Festival, where he was the youngest delegate.

He has a degree in Business Administration from American University, Washington, D.C.

His uncles are Chetan Anand and Vijay Anand. His cousins are Indian Film director Ketan Anand, Vivek Anand, Indian actor and film-maker Shekhar Kapoor, Neelu, and Aruna. Neelu was married to actor Navin Nischol, while Aruna is married to Parikshit Sahni, son of Balraj Sahni.

He has trained in Wing Tsun in Hong Kong.

Career
He has acted in Anand aur Anand (1984), Car Thief (1986), Main Tere Liye (1988), and Master (2001).

In 2001 his first directorial venture, a martial art film, Master, was released. In 2014 he began work on a Hollywood Movie, Vagator Mixer.

Filmography

References

 Anand, Dev (2007), Romancing With Life, An Autobiography, Penguin/ Viking, pp. p. 162, 165-166, 168, 178, 247, 274-277, 284, 314, 358-59, 411. 

Living people
Indian male screenwriters
Male actors from Zürich
1956 births